Tissanga kiboriana is a moth in the family Eupterotidae. It was described by Patrick Basquin and Philippe Darge in 2011. It is found in Tanzania.

References

Moths described in 2011
Eupterotidae